Grand Island (formerly referred to as Taylor Island or La Isla de los Quenensias) is an island lying between Sycamore Slough and the Sacramento River. A post office operated at Grand Island from 1854 to 1919. It is shown, labeled "Taylor Island", on an 1850 survey map of the San Francisco Bay area made by Cadwalader Ringgold and an 1854 map of the area by Henry Lange.

References 

Islands of the Sacramento–San Joaquin River Delta
Islands of Northern California
Islands of Sacramento County, California
Islands of California